AVN TV was the first private television station in Albania. It was founded in 1995.

Defunct television networks in Albania
Television channels and stations established in 1995
1995 establishments in Albania

sq:Fieri#Radiot dhe televizionet